Salmon Lake is a lake in Ontario, Canada.

Salmon Lake may also refer to:

Salmon Lake (Alaska), a lake on the Seward Peninsula
Salmon Lake (New York), a lake in Herkimer County

See also
Salmon Lake Dam, Okanogan County, Washington
Salmon Lake Park, Grapeland, Texas
Salmon Lake State Park, Montana
Big Salmon Lake (Ontario)